Great Music Award, is the highest prize awarded by the Latvian state in the field of music. Award winners receive a monetary prize, and a silver statuette, created by Armands Jēkabsons.

References

External links
 

Latvian music awards